The Downtown Hollister Historic District, in Hollister, California, is a historic district which was listed on the National Register of Historic Places in 1992.

The district includes 53 contributing buildings in a  area roughly bounded by Fourth, East, South and Monterey Streets.  It also included 29 non-contributing buildings and 10 parcels that were empty in 1992.  It includes Monterey Street and cross-streets from Fourth to South.

Its contributing buildings include:

Masonic Temple (c.1908), 355 San Benito St., has a domed cupola, a Masonic building
a Carnegie library
135 5th Street, a former post office building, built around 1935 in Spanish Colonial Revival style.

References

Historic districts on the National Register of Historic Places in California
National Register of Historic Places in San Benito County, California
Italianate architecture in California
Mission Revival architecture in California